The Regulatory Authority for Audiovisual and Digital Communication (ARCOM)  is the  resulting from the merger on 1 January 2022 of the High Audiovisual Council (CSA) and the High Authority for the Distribution of Works and Protection of Rights on the Internet (Hadopi). ARCOM is responsible for both audiovisual and digital communications. 

Among its objectives are the fight against digital piracy, and illegal mirror sites. In addition, legislative measures have been taken to give the agency new powers in the fight against the illegal broadcasting of sports events and competitions.

See also

 Autorité de Régulation des Communications Électroniques, des Postes et de la Distribution de la Presse (ARCEP)
 Copyright aspects of downloading and streaming
 Copyright law of France
 DADVSI
 Graduated response
 Ley Sinde
 Superior Council of Artistic and Literary Property
 Telecoms Package

References 

Computing legislation
French copyright law